Goblintown Mill, also known as Turner's Mill, Wood's Mill, Walker's Mill, and Martin's Mill, is a historic grist mill complex located near Stuart, Patrick County, Virginia. The mill dates to the 1850s, and is a two-story, timber frame building on a dry stone foundation. The mill retains its original mill race and milling machinery.  Associated with the mill is a 1 1/2-story, frame "storehouse" that housed a general store and dwelling.  It was built about 1902.

It was listed on the National Register of Historic Places in 2004.

References

External links
The Goblintown Grist Mill

Grinding mills on the National Register of Historic Places in Virginia
Industrial buildings completed in 1850
Buildings and structures in Patrick County, Virginia
National Register of Historic Places in Patrick County, Virginia
Grinding mills in Virginia